The following is a partial list of New York University staff. Another partial list of notable New York University administrators and staff is available on NNDB website: New York University administrators

 Dale Allender
 Daniel Altman
 H. A. Berlin
 Murray Boren
 David Brimmer
 Chelsea Clinton
 Ralph W. Conant
 Frank Miles Day
 Jennifer Fisher
 Geoffrey S. Fletcher
 Leo Galland
 Patricia Goldman-Rakic
 Jefferson Han
 Mary J. Hickman
 Thea D. Hodge
 Ashley Kahn
 Donald Mattison
 Grigori Perelman
 Julie Salamon
 Ruth Sergel
 Joanna Waley-Cohen
 Michael Whalen (composer)
 E. Frances White
Pharrell Williams
Robert Ubell

References

New York University-related lists